Hellwald's spiny rat (Maxomys hellwaldii) is a species of rodent in the family Muridae.
It is found only on Sulawesi in Indonesia.

References

Rats of Asia
Maxomys
Endemic fauna of Indonesia
Rodents of Indonesia
Mammals described in 1878
Taxonomy articles created by Polbot